Wesley Branch Rickey Jr. (January 31, 1914 – April 10, 1961) was an American front office executive in Major League Baseball. The son of Baseball Hall of Fame club executive Branch Rickey, who among his many achievements invented the farm system and led the movement within baseball to break the color line, Branch Jr. — called "The Twig" by many — was a highly respected farm system director, but never headed his own organization. He was the father of Branch Barrett Rickey, widely known as "Branch Rickey III", a longtime baseball executive in the major and minor leagues.

Like his father, Rickey graduated from Ohio Wesleyan University and attended the University of Michigan School of Law. Branch Jr. entered baseball in 1935 as business manager of the  Albany Travelers of the Class D Georgia–Florida League, one of the many farm clubs in his father's St. Louis Cardinals organization. In 1939, he joined the archrival Brooklyn Dodgers as farm system director, recruited by the then-Brooklyn president, Larry MacPhail. However, in a strange turn of events, when MacPhail resigned at the end of the 1942 season to rejoin the armed forces, he was replaced by Branch Sr., who in 1945 became a co-owner of the Brooklyn club.

The younger Rickey then worked with his father as the Dodgers' farm director through 1947, then as assistant general manager, until the end of the 1950 season, when Walter O'Malley acquired controlling interest in the team and forced Rickey Sr., his former partner, out of the Brooklyn front office.

Rickey Sr. then moved to the Pittsburgh Pirates as executive vice president and general manager, with Branch Jr. accompanying him as the Pirates' vice president and farm system director. The younger Rickey held that post until his death in Pittsburgh at age 47 on April 10, 1961. He had long been troubled by diabetes, and hepatitis and pneumonia were also factors in his passing. He was buried in the Rickey family plot in Rushtown, Scioto County, Ohio.

Although the 1951–55 reign of Branch Sr. as GM of the Pirates was at the time viewed as a failure, he and Branch Jr. put into place the successful Pittsburgh organization of the 1960s and 1970s. Led by the great Roberto Clemente, drafted by the Rickeys from the Dodgers, the Bucs won the 1960 World Series and the 1971 World Series. Pittsburgh contended through the rest of that decade, winning its last Series in 1979.

References

Rickey Jr., Branch
Rickey Jr., Branch
Rickey Jr., Branch
Deaths from diabetes
Major League Baseball farm directors
Rickey Jr., Branch
Rickey Jr., Branch
Sportspeople from St. Louis